Amir Arsalan Khalatbari Tonekaboni  (1904- 1976) was an Iranian lawyer, politician and a representative of the National Assembly and one of the founders of the Bar Association.

He served as governor of Gilan, and was succeeded in this post by Mohammad Ali Keshavarz Sadr.

Party affiliation 
Khalatbari was a member of the Iran Party from 1944 to 1945. He campaigned with Nosratollah Amini for Mossadegh's election at the time that the future prime minister had settled at Ferdows Garden and joined his National Front upon establishment, but left the organization in 1950.

References

1904 births
1976 deaths
20th-century Iranian lawyers
National Front (Iran) politicians
Mayors of Tehran
Iran Party politicians
Members of the 19th Iranian Majlis
Members of the 20th Iranian Majlis